Kim Eon Hee (born 1953) is a South Korean poet. She is known as the “Medusa of Korean poetry" for her use of unconventional language, grotesque images, and destruction in various forms in order to continuously shock readers.

Life 
Kim Eon Hee was born in 1953 in Jinju, Gyeongsang Province. In her second year at Jinju Girls’ Middle School, she won first place in her school's writing contest and received the guidance of Poet Kim Suk-kyu, becoming active in her school's literature club. Her high school homeroom teacher once told her that her personality was “excessively honest” and she herself has stated that she has a “hatred towards excessive coyness.” This personality is expressed through a straightforwardness and radicalness and also manifests itself in Kim Eon Hee's poetic world which seems at odds with/incongruous with the real world/reality/life. When her first poetry collection received negative reviews, her husband attempted to dissuade her from writing poetry and she reportedly gave him the cold shoulder and stopped talking to him for six months.

She has expressed her belief that she believes all artistic mediums contain the identical essence and it is only their expressive form that differs. Apart from literature, she is well-versed in film and surrealist art. She enjoys the works of film director David Lynch and the painter Giorgio de Chirico. She also named her own work room “mumuchong” (無無塚) as an homage to the Korean abstract expression painter Wook-kyung Choi, who named their own atelier “mumudang” (無無堂).

In 1989, she published the poem “Goyohan nara” (고요한 나라 Tranquil Land) along with nine others and emerged within the literary world. Beginning with her first poetry collection, Teureongkeu (트렁크 Trunk), in 1995, she has shocked the literary world with her brutal and obscene images. Moreover, there was a controversy within feminist circles regarding the violence towards women's bodies portrayed in her 2000 poetry collection, Mallajugeun aengdunamu arae jamjaneun jeo yeoja (말라죽은 앵두나무 아래 잠자는 저 여자 That Girl Sleeping Beneath the Withered Cherry Tree). With the publication of Tteutbakkui daedap (뜻밖의 대답 Unexpected Response) in 2005, she demonstrated a prominent change with her questioning of poetry in and of itself becoming more serious and a notable esotericism. In her 2011 collection, Yojeum uulhasimnikka? (요즘 우울하십니까? Have You Been Feeling Blue These Days?), she broke from conventional Korean publishing practices in which separately authored introductions and a commentary or interpretation is included within Korean poetry books. Instead, she chose to forego these two sections and included her own author's introduction and epilogue. This poetry collection was translated into English and published in 2019 in the United States. In 2016, she published her poetry collection Bogo sipeun oppa (보고 싶은 오빠 The Man I Miss). In 2004, she quit her teaching activities of nearly 30 years and decided to solely devote herself to her creative writing.

She won the 2005 Gyeongnam Literary Award (경남문학상), the 2013 Yi Sang  Literary Award for Poetry, the 2014 Poetry and Thought Literary Award (시와사상문학상), and the 2016 Tongyeong City Cheongma Literary Award (통영시 문학상 청마문학상). From 2016 to 2019, she served as the chairperson for the Council for the Enhancement of Equality in Literature (형명문학선양사업회) and has served as the chairperson of the Equality in Literary Institutions Steering Committee (형명문학제 운영위원회) since 2019.

Writing 
Her work has been subject to academic analysis.

Unconventional language and images 
The most notable characteristics of Kim Eon Hee's poetry are her brutal images of bodies, the use of explicit language and slang, and the use of a direct eroticism. Lines such as “Escaping as I drag my entrails dribbling out of me,” “My flayed open belly,” “Your penis that skewers me from my mouth to my anus like a thread” that portray figures such as prostitutes consistently appear in her poems from Teureongkeu (1995) to Bogo sipeun oppa (2016). Because of her use of unconventional language and bizarre poetic images, her poetry has been called “unintelligible poetry,” “destructive poetry,” and “poetry of cruelty.”

Of course, Kim Eon Hee's poems are not intended as a kind of pornography or a sexual fantasy; rather, their goal is to portray the true nature of reality. Her characterizing tendency to abruptly and openly challenge the horrible truths of reality that people want to ostracize has earned her the nickname “the Medusa of the Literary World.” The shock, fear, and repulsion that her poetry's heartless language and images invoke ultimately disclose the falsity and hypocrisy of oppressive institutions and can thus be seen as an avant-gardist attempt.

The breaking of taboos 
Through the use of extreme images embodying an overwhelming sense of sacrilege and blasphemy, she evokes an unpleasant and nauseating sentiment. Through this “uncomfortable” poetry, she provides a stimulus for shattering the reader's basic frame of reference, expanding their spectrum of thought, and breaking a consciousness of lies.

Kim's second poetry collection, Mallajugeun aengdunamu arae jamjaneun jeo yeoja, by candidly portraying a father's violence, demonstrates opposition and resistance to the established order that the father comes to represent. In particular, the poem “Gajok geukjang” (가족극장 Family Theater) in the third chapter uses the repetition of an emasculated father, stepfather, incestual relations with the father, etc. to directly describe the reality of a patriarchal and androcentric order that seeks to oppress women.

Her third poetry collection, Tteutbakkui daedap, with its striking abstruseness, goes one step beyond resisting androcentrism and expands to include a repudiation of all established orders such as civilizations, institutions, and ideologies. The denial and destruction of taboos in Kim Eon Hee's poetry has been interpreted as simultaneously signifying an opposition to civilization as well as embodying the strength to destroy law and systems.

Works

Poetry collections 
《트렁크》, 세계사, 1995 / Teureongkeu (Trunk), Segyesa, 1995.
《말라죽은 앵두나무 아래 잠자는 저 여자》, 민음사, 2000 / Mallajugeun aengdunamu arae jamjaneun jeo yeoja (That Girl Sleeping Beneath the Withered Cherry Tree), Minumsa, 2000.
《뜻밖의 대답》, 민음사, 2005 / Tteutbakkui daedap (Unexpected Response), Minumsa, 2005.
《보고 싶은 오빠》, 창비, 2016 / Bogo sipeun oppa (The Man I Miss), Changbi, 2016.

Works in translation 
《요즘 우울하십니까?》, 문학동네, 2011 / Have You Been Feeling Blue These Days?, Noemi Press, 2019.

Awards 
Bak Inhwan Literary Award (박인환문학상, 2004)
Gyeongnam Literary Award (경남문학상, 2005)
Yi Sang Literary Award for Poetry (2013)
Poetry and Thought Literary Award (시와사상문학상, 2014)
Tongyeong City Cheongma Literary Award (통영시 문학상 청마문학상, 2016)

Further reading 
Kim, Namho. “(Theory of a Work) Poetry of a Bidet with a Tongue.” Poetry & World 44 (December 2013).
Kim, Gwangil. “Kim Eon Hee’s Poetry Collection Mallajugeun aengdunamu arae jamjaneun jeo yeoja. ‘The Devil’s Poetry’.... ‘Please do not read the poetry of the old and infirm.’” Chosun Ilbo, 31 March 2000. http://srchdb1.chosun.com/pdf/i_service/pdf_ReadBody.jsp?Y=2000&M=03&D=31&ID=0003312301

References 

1953 births
South Korean poets
People from Jinju
Living people